Alberta Brianti and Sorana Cîrstea were the defending champions, but both chose not to participate this year.
Marina Erakovic and Heather Watson won the title after defeating Līga Dekmeijere and Irina Falconi 6–3, 6–0 in the final.

Seeds

Draw

Draw

References
 Main Draw

Texas Tennis Open - Doubles
2012 Doubles